Adolfo Ducke Forest Reserve (Reserva Florestal Adolpho Ducke) is a protected section of the Amazon rainforest within the city of Manaus, Brazil. 

The reserve was established in 1963 in honour of the entomologist and botanist Adolfo Ducke (October 1876 - January 1959), who was one of the most respected experts on Amazonian flora and is a 10,000 ha protected area on the outskirts of Manaus. It is part of the Long Term Ecological Research (LTER) Network. The reserve sits at the intersection of two major drainage areas, the Amazon River and the Rio Negro. The reserve is made up of research plots designed to study the biota of the regions, which may serve as a basis for biodiversity surveys in other areas of the Amazon region, and to study the impacts of fragmentation. The grid of LTER sites is made up of (25 km2 plots inserted into a larger grid of 64 km2 plots). Within the grid, which is used for straight line transect surveys of biodiversity, there are 250 m long permanent survey plots.

The reserve is one of the most important research sites in the Amazon because it is relatively intact and also easily accessible from the city of Manaus. The reserve includes areas for researchers to stay for extended periods to carry out research and is one of the most intensively studied patches of rain forest in the world.

Manaus
Parks in Brazil
Protected areas of Amazonas (Brazilian state)
Forest reserves